Glyptotrox is a genus of hide beetle in the subfamily Troginae. It contains the following species:

Glyptotrox abei (Ochi, Kon & Kawahara, 2014)
Glyptotrox boucomonti (Paulian, 1933)
Glyptotrox brahminus (Pittino, 1985)
Glyptotrox cambeforti (Pittino, 1985)
Glyptotrox cambodjanus (Pittino, 1985)
Glyptotrox dhaulagiri (Paulus, 1972)
Glyptotrox doiinthanonensis (Masumoto, 1996)
Glyptotrox formosanus (Nomura, 1973)
Glyptotrox foveicollis (Harold, 1872)
Glyptotrox frontera (Vaurie, 1955)
Glyptotrox hamatus (Robinson, 1940)
Glyptotrox inadai (Ochi, Kawahara & Inagaki, 2008)
Glyptotrox ineptus (Balthasar, 1931)
Glyptotrox insularis (Chevrolat, 1864)
Glyptotrox kerleyi (Masumoto, 1996)
Glyptotrox kiuchii (Masumoto, 1996)
Glyptotrox mandli (Balthasar, 1931)
Glyptotrox matsudai (Ochi & Hori, 1999)
Glyptotrox mutsuensis (Nomura, 1937)
Glyptotrox niisatorui (Ochi, Kon & Kawahara, 2014)
Glyptotrox opacotuberculatus (Motschulsky, 1860)
Glyptotrox parvisetosus (Ochi, Kon & Bai, 2010)
Glyptotrox paulseni (Ratcliffe, 2016)
Glyptotrox poggii (Ochi, Kon & Kawahara, 2014)
Glyptotrox poringensis (Ochi, Kon & Kawahara, 2005)
Glyptotrox simi (Robinson, 1940)
Glyptotrox spinulosus (Robinson, 1940)
Glyptotrox sugayai (Masumoto & Kiuchi, 1995)
Glyptotrox taiwanus (Masumoto, Ochi & Li, 2005)
Glyptotrox terrestris (Say, 1825)
Glyptotrox tibialis (Masumoto, Ochi & Li, 2005)
Glyptotrox uenoi (Nomura, 1961)
Glyptotrox vietnamicus Ochi, Kon & Pham, 2020
Glyptotrox vimmeri (Balthasar, 1931)
Glyptotrox yamayai (Nakane, 1983)
Glyptotrox yangi (Masumoto, Ochi & Li, 2005)

References

Trogidae
Beetles described in 2016